The Tesla Semi is a battery electric Class 8 semi-truck by Tesla, Inc. The truck is powered by three motors, and is claimed by Tesla to have approximately three times the power of a typical diesel semi truck, a range of , and operate at an energy use of less than .

Two concept vehicles were unveiled in November 2017. Production was originally planned to begin as early as 2019, with Tesla projecting manufacture of as many as 100,000 trucks per year by 2022. Production began in October 2022, and initial deliveries were made to PepsiCo on December 1, 2022.

History 
The Semi was first mentioned in the Tesla 2016 Master Plan. Tesla said at the time that they had a working prototype that used "a bunch" of Tesla Model 3 electric motors.

A concept prototype of the Semi was unveiled at a press conference on November 16, 2017, where Musk provided additional specifics. He claimed that the electric Semi would cost  less to operate than a diesel truck if charged at a Megacharger, which Tesla said in 2017 they could guarantee a price of 7 ¢/kWh (in the United States).

Tesla indicated that the Semi would be equipped with Enhanced Autopilot as standard equipment, offering semi-autonomous capability, and that new technology with active safety controls on the independent motors and wheels would detect and prevent jackknifing. Musk said that the system could eventually allow several units to operate in an autopilot-based convoy, led by a truck with a driver, that would be a cheaper alternative to rail transport. At the time, platooning was legal in only eight U.S. states and all required a human driver in each truck, so changes in legislation would be necessary to achieve that technology capability. The battery packs would be located under the floor of the cab, between the front and driving wheels.
At the Semi and Roadster unveiling event, Musk stated "Production [of the semi] begins in 2019, so if you order now, you get the truck in 2 years." Tesla intends to warrant the drivetrain for 1 million miles.

In 2018, Tesla announced that Semi prototypes were being tested with real cargo, hauling battery packs from Nevada to California.

Company plans to put the semi into production were substantially delayed. At the 2017 unveiling, production was slated to begin in 2019. In June 2019, Tesla projected that production would start by the end of 2020.  In January 2020, Musk stated that a lack of battery production capability was one limiting factor for the conservative Semi production timeline, with the company choosing to use battery supply for passenger cars instead.
In January 2021, the company announced that Semi production would be delayed until the end of 2021, as the company hoped to ramp up high-volume production of its tabless 4680 battery cells (previewed in September 2020) to meet the demand for the Semi and other vehicles. In October 2021, Musk announced that the production of the Semi would not start in 2021 and that it could slip into 2023.

In October 2022, Musk announced on Twitter the start of production of the  range model that would be delivered in December.

In November 2022, the company reported that a Tesla Semi had completed a  drive while weighing .

On December 1, 2022, Tesla began customer deliveries at an evening event hosted at the manufacturing facility in Nevada.  PepsiCo received the first Semis of their large order for use with Pepsi beverage and Frito-Lay snack food transportation fleets. PepsiCo Vice President Mike O'Connell stated that the Semis can haul Frito-Lay food products for around 425 miles (684 km), but for heavier loads of sodas, the trucks will do shorter trips of around 100 miles (160 km).

Before and since the delivery to PepsiCo, several Tesla Semis have been reportedly seen on the side of the road receiving road assistance, raising questions as to their reliability.

Design 
Tesla Semi is powered by three carbon-fiber wrapped motors, offering three times the power of typical diesel semi trucks, although it consumes only . One motor  operates continuously at optimal efficiency, while the other two motors provide additional power for acceleration and hills.

The driver's seat is centered in the cab. The ceiling allows an adult to stand up. Touchscreen displays are set on both sides of the steering wheel, with no other instrument panels.

It includes the same camera set as Tesla's passenger vehicles. Tesla claims that its safety system can prevent jackknifing.

Tesla Semi has a 1,000 volt power train and charging system, an increase from Tesla's standard 400 volt system, but a capability Tesla also intends to extend to the Cybertruck.  Charging will be supported at a new generation of Tesla vehicle charging infrastructure called the Tesla Megacharger.

Third party estimates 

, some industry experts viewed heavy-duty freight as impractical for battery trucks due to cost and weight. A senior VP at Daseke, a large trucking company, said that the limited range affected their likelihood of operating the Semi until the necessary infrastructure was in place. Bill Gates also held similar concerns.

A Bloomberg L.P. report stated that given the battery technology available in November 2017 with the assumption that the technology would be the same when Tesla brought the Semi to market, the company's estimates for charging times, range per charge, and costs could not be achieved with 2017 technology, with other analysts explicitly suggesting that Tesla could be planning on increased battery energy density advances in the next few years to meet its stated goals.

A June 2017 theoretical analysis of arbitrary electric semi trucks, was made by researchers from the Carnegie Mellon College of Engineering, ostensibly in response to Musk's description of Tesla's work on a "a heavy duty, long-range semi truck" at a talk in April 2017. The analysis estimated power needs, loads and ranges for an electric truck, given battery technologies known at that time. The analysis indicated that an electric semi might be feasible for short- or medium-range hauling, but would not be for long-range hauling, as the weight of the batteries required would take up too much of the weight allowed by US law.

Competitive electric semis 
Other electric semi trucks in production in the market as of 2022 include the Volvo VNR Electric, Peterbilt 579EV, Kenworth T680E, Freightliner eCascadia, and Nikola Tre.

On November 24, 2022 Renault Trucks (subsidiary of Volvo AB) delivered the first electric trucks to Coca-Cola Europacific Partners in Belgium.

See also 
 Megawatt Charging System – Direct current (DC) charging system for large battery electric vehicles
 Hyundai Xcient - Class 8 world's first mass produced fuel cell truck
 Toyota Project Portal – Class 8 fuel cell truck

References

External links 

 
 Numbers starting to add up for Tesla trucks: DHL executive, president at DHL Supply Chain comments, Reuters, February 23, 2018
 Tesla Semi orders list; 646 as of July 29, 2019

Semi
Proposed vehicles
Vehicles introduced in 2017
Electric trucks
Class 8 trucks
Tractor units